New York held various elections on November 5, 2002.

Federal

United States House

New York lost 2 seats following congressional apportionment.

State

Governor

George Pataki, a Republican, was re-elected to a third term.

Attorney General

Democratic Eliot Spitzer was re-elected to a 2nd term as Attorney General.

Comptroller

Alan Hevesi was elected to replace fellow Democrat Carl McCall, who ran unsuccessfully for governor.

State Senate

A district was added.

State Assembly

Local

See also
New York gubernatorial elections
New York state elections

 
2002
New York